iwoca Ltd. is an online Fintech company based in London. It offers credit facilities to small businesses trading in the UK and Germany via an automated lending platform. CEO Christoph Rieche and CTO James Dear founded iwoca in October 2011 and the company started trading in March 2012. They aimed to offer custom-built loans to small businesses, who usually struggled with fair access to finance from big banks. To start with, these were exclusively e-commerce businesses, but in April 2014, iwoca began lending to all types of small businesses. By July 2015, it was reported to have seen 250% year-on-year growth in issuance.

iwoca provides credit lines of up to £200,000 and business loans of up to £500,000. It uses various machine learning models to automatically assess businesses based on data taken directly from Xero, eBay, Amazon, PayPal, Sage Pay, business bank accounts and other online and offline platforms. This follows a similar model to the one used by Kabbage in the United States. It's also integrated its credit API with the Tide bank. A 3% monthly interest rate and maximum loan term of 12 months are typical. 

In 2018, iwoca doubled its revenues to £48 million and reached profitability.

As of October 2019, iwoca has now funded more than £1 billion to over 30,000 businesses since inception and made funding available to over 50,000 across a range of industries through its platform in the UK and Germany and has raised £350 million in equity and debt finance. It has stated that its mission is to fund one million small businesses. Its platform and successes were referenced by Governor of the Bank of England Mark Carney in a speech about technology and small business lending at the Lord Mayor's Banquet for Bankers and Merchants of the City of London.

History
iwoca is funded by private investors and venture capitalists. 

In January 2014, it announced that it had raised £5 million in investment from Global Founders Capital and Redline Capital Management, to be used for UK and European expansion. 

In July 2015, it announced that it had raised $20 million equity from investors including CommerzVentures and venture capital firm Acton Capital Partners in its Series B round. 

iwoca entered the German market in 2015, and has since established itself as one of the largest Fintech small business lenders – paying out the highest number of loans to small businesses in the country.  

In February 2019, the company raised $194 million through a Series D funding round and has received £10 million from the Capability and Innovations Fund Banking Competition Remedies grant. As part of this grant, iwoca promised to fulfil six commitments including co-developing new products with Xero, launching iwocaPay (an invoice payment solution for SMEs) and opening offices outside of London to serve their diverse range of customers. On top of this, iwoca promised to match the £10 million grant with £13 million of its own funds. 

In January 2020, iwoca announced that it was opening a new office in Leeds, creating 100 new jobs in Yorkshire by 2023.

Awards
In 2012, iwoca won a Smarta 100 award as one of the most disruptive small businesses in the UK. Since then they have been selected by UK Startup Awards as a Top Twenty UK Startup and won the Wired Money Startup Pitch. 

In May 2015, iwoca was named Alternative Lender of the Year for Commercial Credit in the Credit Today awards. 

In 2018, iwoca was also awarded NACFB Small Funder of the Year and Xero Financial Services App of the Year. It is currently #34 in the Sunday Times Tech Track 100.

In 2019, iwoca was awarded Best Fintech Lender (Short-term) at the Lending Awards.

Community 
In November 2019, iwoca announced its partnership with Kendal Cycling Club – a club based in the Lake District with just under 700 members. The partnership offers free membership to the club for small business owners with the aim of improving mental and physical health. Research by Xero found that 80% of small business owners have experienced stress in the last six months, and iwoca's initiative aims to help them feel healthier, happier and better connected.

References

External links

Financial services companies of the United Kingdom
Financial services companies established in 2011
Companies based in the London Borough of Camden
2011 establishments in the United Kingdom
Companies established in 2011
Financial services
Financial services companies of Germany